La Villa Louis  in Lion-sur-Mer, Normandy, France, was built in 1864 for Pierre Joseph Pasquet to be used as a casino. In 1903 he married Elisa Auber, Daniel Auber's daughter, and modify the building to be use as a villa. The French architect Jean Alexandre Navarre add the first floor with the Art-Nouveau loggia on the sea side. The ceramics of the both side of the house are the works of Alexandre Bigot. It is a listed historical monument since 1998.

References

Houses in France
Houses completed in 1903
Bluette
Art Nouveau architecture in France
Art Nouveau houses
1864 establishments in France
20th-century architecture in France